The commune of Buhinyuza is a commune of Muyinga Province in northeastern Burundi. The capital lies at Buhinyuza.

References

Communes of Burundi
Muyinga Province